The Coming Collapse of China is a book by Gordon G. Chang, published in 2001, in which he argued that the Chinese Communist Party (CCP) was the root cause of many of China's problems and would cause the country's collapse by 2011. When 2011 was almost over, Chang admitted that his prediction was wrong but said it was off by only a year, asserting in Foreign Policy that the CCP would fall in 2012. Consequently he made the magazine's "10 worst predictions of the year" twice.

Summary 
In the introduction of his first edition published in 2001, Gordon G. Chang, an American lawyer, predicted the following scenario:

The end of the modern Chinese state is near. The People's Republic has five years, perhaps ten, before it falls. This book tells why. 

Based on the perceived inefficiency of state-run enterprises and the inability of the Chinese Communist Party to build an open democratic society, Chang argued that the hidden non-performing loans of the "Big Four" Chinese state banks would likely bring down China's financial system and its communist government, along with the entire country. He predicted specifically that the party would collapse by 2011.

Reception 
Dexter Roberts of Bloomberg Businessweek described the book as "Pessimism on a grand scale."

In 2002, Julia Lovell of The Observer noted that although China's entry to the World Trade Organization could provide Western investors with many new opportunities, Chang's book "marshalled ample evidence to dampen such expectations."
In 2001, Patrick Tyler of The New York Times wrote:
Academic Roland Boer describes the book as an example of the "China doomer" approach to historical nihilism.

Updates 
In 2010, Chang wrote in The Christian Science Monitor that "China could fail soon" and predicted an economic crash. In an article, "The Coming Collapse of China: 2012 Edition," published by the Foreign Policy magazine website, Gordon G. Chang admitted that his prediction was wrong but arguing that he was off only by one year: "Instead of 2011, the mighty communist party of China will fall in 2012. Bet on it." On May 21, 2016, The National Interest published another article by Chang, "China's Coming Revolution." In it, he argued that the ruling class in China is divided and that it cannot deal with its economic problems. Chang claimed that would lead to a revolution, which would overthrow the Communist Party. He did not give the exact year that those events would take place.

See also

 The Coming War With Japan
The Coming Conflict with China

References 

2001 non-fiction books
Books about the People's Republic of China